Zibo City Sports Centre Stadium is a football stadium in Zibo, China. It hosts football matches and hosted the 2010 AFC U-19 Championship. The stadium holds 45,000 spectators.

References

External links
Stadium information

Football venues in China
Sports venues in Shandong